Ruinas is a comune (municipality) in the Province of Oristano in the Italian region Sardinia, located about  north of Cagliari and about  east of Oristano.

Ruinas borders the following municipalities: Allai, Asuni, Mogorella, Samugheo, Siamanna, Villa Sant'Antonio, Villaurbana.

References

Cities and towns in Sardinia